Sotiris Balafas (born 19 August 1986) is a Greek professional footballer who plays as a defensive midfielder.
He is a defensive midfielder known for his defensive awareness, his tackling and heading skills as well as his pace and strength.

Club career
Balafas started his career in Anagennisi Artas and became an integral part of the team at very young age. He was mostly performing the duties of a centre back in his old club in contrast to his later role at PAOK.

In the summer of 2005 he was picked up by PAOK for a transfer fee of 80,000 Euros. After a while he became a first-team option. In the 2007–2008 season he was the first choice defensive midfielder for most of the season and was cooperating well with newcomer Ricardo Matias Verón.

Holding a secondary role in Fernando Santos's plans for the 2009–2010 season, Balafas agreed during the pre-season to move on loan to the newly promoted PAS Giannina for one year. It was reported that the main reason for his choice to play for a minor club, was the possibility to work again with his mentor Georgios Paraschos.

During the 2011–12 season, after a lot of injuries among more senior players of the team, Balafas took his chances for the Europa League and after the winning goal against FC Karpaty Lviv became a fan favorite and his coach László Bölöni gave him more chances of playing time.

In the 2012–13 season, he decided to play abroad for Hoverla. In May 2014 he was released from the club.

On 10 September 2014, the Superleague club Veria signed Balafas on a free transfer. He made his official debut against PAS Giannina during the fifth matchday of the Superleague. He scored his first goal for Veria in a 2–0 home win against Platanias as he opened the score. Balafas renewed his contract with Veria on 29 May 2015 for two more years. His new contract is due to expire on 31 June 2017. On 22 August 2015, Balafas was injured during training. He was diagnosed with clot rupture and the estimated time of his cure was about three to four months.

International career
He has been a basic part of the Greece national under-21 football team along with former PAOK teammates Stelios Iliadis and Lazaros Christodoulopoulos, being capped for more than 10 times.

Club statistics

"Statistics accurate as of 5 January 2012"

References

Living people
1986 births
Greek footballers
Greece under-21 international footballers
Greek expatriate footballers
Anagennisi Arta F.C. players
PAOK FC players
PAS Giannina F.C. players
Ergotelis F.C. players
Veria F.C. players
FC Hoverla Uzhhorod players
Super League Greece players
Football League (Greece) players
Ukrainian Premier League players
Expatriate footballers in Ukraine
Greek expatriate sportspeople in Ukraine
Footballers from Arta, Greece
Association football midfielders